Abashevo is the name of several rural localities in Russia:
Abashevo, Chuvash Republic, a selo in Abashevskoye Rural Settlement of Cheboksarsky District in the Chuvash Republic
Abashevo, Nizhny Novgorod Oblast, a village in Butakovsky Selsoviet of Voznesensky District in Nizhny Novgorod Oblast; 
Abashevo, Penza Oblast, a selo in Abashevsky Selsoviet of Spassky District in Penza Oblast
Abashevo, Samara Oblast, a selo in Khvorostyansky District of Samara Oblast; 
Abashevo, Udmurt Republic, a village in Shamardanovsky Selsoviet of Yukamensky District in the Udmurt Republic; 
Abashevo, Yaroslavl Oblast, a village in Blagoveshchensky Rural Okrug of Bolsheselsky District in Yaroslavl Oblast